Jorge Boero may refer to:

* Jorge Andrés Boero (1973–2012), Argentine motorcycle racer
 Jorge Martínez Boero (1937–2004), Argentine racing driver